Otto Feige may refer to:

Otto Feige (naval officer), German admiral in command of the operation to transfer German cruiser Lützow to the Soviet Union in 1939
A possible identity of B. Traven